Clifton Reynes is a village and civil parish in the unitary authority area of the City of Milton Keynes, Buckinghamshire, England. It is about a mile east of Olney. It shares a joint parish council with Newton Blossomville.

Extent
It is bounded, on the North, by the River Great Ouse, by which this parish is separated from Lavendon and Cold Brayfield; on the East, by Newton-Blossomville; on the South, by Petsoe and Emberton; and on the West, by the latter and by Olney.

Origin of name
The village name comes in two parts: the former name 'Clifton' is Anglo Saxon in origin and means 'Cliff farm', referring to the village's position on a cliff on a bank of the River Ouse.  The latter name 'Reynes' refers to the ancient lords of the manor of the village, whose family name this was.  In the Domesday Book on 1086 Clifton Reynes was recorded as Cliftone.

Buildings of note

The parish church dedicated to St Mary is (unusually for a Buckinghamshire church) completely castellated: even the gables are embattled. The tower is thought to be Norman; however, the top is later probably 14th century. The majority of the building is of the 13th, 14th and 15th centuries and the nave is unusually tall. Features of interest include the 14th-century font and the medieval monuments of the Reynes family. These include two pairs of wooden effigies; one pair is of Ralph and Amabel de Reynes (ca. 1320–30) and the other is unidentified and slightly earlier.

References

External links

Villages in Buckinghamshire
Areas of Milton Keynes
Civil parishes in Buckinghamshire